Erling Juul (14 February 1897 – 4 January 1989) was a Norwegian track and field athlete who competed in the 1920 Summer Olympics. In 1920 he finished eleventh in the triple jump competition.

References

External links
list of Norwegian athletes

1897 births
1989 deaths
Norwegian male triple jumpers
Olympic athletes of Norway
Athletes (track and field) at the 1920 Summer Olympics